Elections to Barnsley Metropolitan Borough Council were held on 6 May 1982, with one third of the council up for election with an additional vacancy in Royston. Prior to the election, Labour had gained a seat from Residents in a Dodsworth by-election, with another Residents councillor in Wombwell North defecting to the Labour grouping, offsetting a by-election loss in Penistone East to the recently formed SDP-Liberal Alliance. Alliance had also seen defections to them from the Independent Labour councillor in Hoyland East and the defending (formerly Residents) councillor in Darton.

Election result

This resulted in the following composition of the council:

Ward results

+/- figures represent changes from the last time these wards were contested.

References

1982 English local elections
1982
1980s in South Yorkshire